Plague of Dreams is a 2005 album by The Everybodyfields.

Track listing
Magazines
The Only King
Leaving
By Your Side
Arletta
Baby Please
Out of Town
Can't Have It
Fade Jeans Blue
In Your Boots
Good to Be Home
Angels

The Everybodyfields albums
2005 albums